The BMW B48 is a turbocharged inline-four petrol engine which replaced the BMW N20 and has been in production since 2014. It was first used in the F56 Mini Hatch and has been used in BMW applications since 2015.

Design 
Compared with its N20 predecessor, the B48 uses a more undersquare design, and engine block in "closed-deck construction". As per the N20, the block and head are made from aluminium. Other features shared with the N20 include a twin-scroll turbocharger, direct injection, variable valve lift (Valvetronic) and variable valve timing (Double VANOS).

Models

115 kW version 
 2020-present G20 318i

125 kW version 
 2019-present G20 320i (Turkey Version)
 2020-present G22 420i (Turkey Version)
 2021-present G26 420i (Turkey Version)
 2017-present G30 520i (Turkey Version)
 2018-present G01 X3 sdrive20i (Turkey Version)

131 kW version 
 2021–present F54 MINI Cooper S Clubman (B48A20M)
 2020-present F40 BMW 120i

135 kW version 

 2016–2019 F20 120i
 2016–2019 F22/F23 220i
 2015–2019 F30/F31/F34 320i
 2016–2019 F30 330e
 2016-2019 F33/F36 420i
2017–present G30/G31 520i
2018-present G30/G31 530e
 2018–present G01 X3 xDrive20i
 2018–present G02 X4 xDrive20i
 2019–present G20 320i
 2019–present G20 330e
 2020-present G22 420i
 2021-present G42 220i

141 kW version 

 2017–2020 F60 MINI Cooper S Countryman

145 kW version   

 2014–present F56 MINI Cooper S (B48A20A)
 2020–present F44 220i Gran Coupe
 2016–present F48 X1 20i
 2017–present F39 X2 sDrive20i
2018–present G29 Z4 sDrive20i
 2019–present J29/DB82 Toyota Supra (Japanese SZ models)

165 kW version 
 2016–2019 F20 125i
 2021–present UO6 223i

170 kW version 
 2014–present F56 MINI JCW Hardtop and JCW Cabrio (320 Nm)
 2017–present F56 MINI JCW Clubman and JCW Countryman ALL4 (350 Nm)
 2015–present F45 Active Tourer 225i
 2016–present F48 X1 25i/28i
 2017–present F39 X2 25i/28i
 2019–current F44 228i Gran Coupé xDrive

185 kW version 
 2015–2018 F30/F31/F34 330i
 2016–present F22/F23 230i
 2016–present F32/F33/F36 430i
 2018–present G01 X3 xDrive30i
 2018–present G02 X4 xDrive30i
 2020–present G01 X3 xDrive30e (PHEV Version)
 2016–present G30/G31 530i

180 kW version 
 2022-present G42 230i
 2022–present G20/G21 330i
 2022–present G22 430i

190 kW version 
 2016–present G11 730i/730Li
 2017–2019 G11 740e xDrive/740Le xDrive (combined with an 82 kW electric motor for a total output of 240 kW)
 2017–2021 G32 630i
 2019–present G20/G21 330i
 2019-present G29 Z4 sDrive30i
 2019–present J29/DB22 Toyota Supra
 2020-present Morgan Plus Four
 2020–present G22 430i

195 kW version 
 2020–present BMW F40 128ti

225 kW version 
This engine features a reinforced crankshaft with larger main bearings and new pistons with a lower 9.5:1 compression ratio. This allows the engine to take more boost pressure from a larger turbocharger, which blows compressed air through a reworked intake tract. Revealed in May 2019, this engine is shared with the new MINI Countryman JCW, Clubman JCW and JCW GP models.

2019–present F40 M135i xDrive
2019–present F44 M235i xDrive Gran Coupé
 2019–present F39 X2 M35i xDrive
 2019–present F54 Clubman JCW
 2019–present F60 Countryman JCW
 2020–present F56 MINI John Cooper Works GP

References 

B48
Products introduced in 2014
Straight-four engines
Gasoline engines by model